Maleventum is the fourth studio album by Italian symphonic black metal band Opera IX, released in 2002 through Avantgarde Music. It was the only album of the band that featured Madras on vocals and Taranis on drums; they replaced former vocalist Cadaveria and drummer Flegias, who departed the band the year before.

Track listing

Personnel
 Opera IX
 Madras — vocals
 Ossian D'Ambrosio — guitars
 Vlad — bass
 Taranis — drums
 Lunaris — keyboards

2002 albums
Opera IX albums
Avantgarde Music albums